HMS Broadsword may refer to:

Ships
 , was a  launched in 1946 and broken up in 1968.
 , was a Type 22 frigate launched in 1975. She was sold to the Brazilian Navy in 1995 and renamed Greenhalgh.

Battle honours
Ships named Broadsword have been awarded the following battle honours:
Falkland Islands 1982

In fiction
HMS Broadsword, a fictional Royal Navy destroyer in Jeffrey Archer's First Among Equals

See also 
 , another name for the Type 22 frigate.
 , a 1943 British Royal Navy ship

Royal Navy ship names